FC Ružinov Bratislava is a Slovak football team, based in the city of Bratislava in the part of city named Ružinov. The club was founded in 1919.

References

External links 
 

Football clubs in Slovakia
Football clubs in Bratislava
Association football clubs established in 1919
Fc Ruzinov Bratislava